Thoroughbred is the seventh album by American singer-songwriter Carole King, released in 1976. Her final release on Ode Records, it was produced by Lou Adler, who had been her collaborator since Tapestry (1971). After Carole King self produced for a number of years on Capitol and Atlantic Records, Lou Adler later rejoined King to produce her 1984 album Speeding Time.

The track "Only Love Is Real" was released as a lead single from the album, and became her 4th and final chart-topper on the U.S. Billboard Adult Contemporary chart. "High Out of Time", a song featuring David Crosby and Graham Nash on vocals, was also released as a single.  Cash Box called "High Out of Time" "a sweet ballad, filled with Carole King's expected but always exciting melody hooks."  Record World called "High Out of Time" a "thoughtful and moving story as only this songstress can relate."  The track "There's a Space Between Us" features harmony vocals by James Taylor.

Track listing
All songs written by Carole King, except where noted.
Side one
"So Many Ways" – 3:11
"Daughter of Light" (Gerry Goffin, King) – 3:11
"High Out of Time" (Goffin, King) – 3:15
"Only Love is Real" – 3:29
"There's a Space Between Us" – 3:20
Side two
"I'd Like to Know You Better" – 2:48
"We All Have to Be Alone" (Goffin, King) – 3:44
"Ambrosia" (King, Dave Palmer) – 3:16
"Still Here Thinking of You" (Goffin, King) – 3:11
"It's Gonna Work Out Fine" – 3:50

Personnel
Carole King – piano, vocals, backing vocals
Danny "Kootch" Kortchmar – guitar, vocals
Russ Kunkel – drums
Ralph MacDonald – percussion
David Crosby – backing vocals
Graham Nash – backing vocals
Tom Scott - saxophone
Leland Sklar – bass guitar
J.D. Souther – backing vocals
James Taylor – guitar, backing vocals
Waddy Wachtel – guitar

Production notes
Lou Adler – producer
Milt Calice – engineer
Hank Cicalo – engineer

Charts

Weekly charts

Year-end charts

Certifications

References

1976 albums
Carole King albums
Albums produced by Lou Adler
Ode Records albums
Albums recorded at A&M Studios